The hammer throw is one of the four throwing events in regular track and field competitions, along with the discus throw, shot put and javelin.

The "hammer" used in this sport is not like any of the tools also called by that name. It consists of a metal ball attached by a steel wire to a grip. The size of the ball varies between men's and women's competitions.

History

With roots dating back to the 15th century, the contemporary version of the hammer throw is one of the oldest of Olympic Games competitions, first included at the 1900 games in Paris, France (the second Olympiad of the modern era). Its history since the late 1960s and legacy prior to inclusion in the Olympics has been dominated by Europe and Eastern European influence, which has affected interest in the event in other parts of the world.

The hammer evolved from its early informal origins to become part of the Scottish Highland games in the late 18th century, where the original version of the event is still contested today.

While the men's hammer throw has been part of the Olympics since 1900, the International Association of Athletics Federations did not start ratifying women's marks until 1995. Women's hammer throw was first included in the Olympics at the 2000 summer games in Sydney, Australia after having been included in the World Championships a year earlier.

Competition

Like the other throwing events, the competition is decided by who can throw the implement the farthest.

Although commonly thought of as a strength event, technical advancements in the last 30 years have developed hammer throw competition to a point where more focus is on speed in order to gain maximum distance.

The throwing motion starts with the thrower swinging the hammer back-and-forth about two times to generate momentum. The thrower then makes three, four or (rarely) five full rotations using a complex heel-toe foot movement, spinning the hammer in a circular path and increasing its angular velocity with each rotation. Rather than spinning the hammer horizontally, it is instead spun in a plane that angles up towards the direction in which it will be launched. The thrower releases the hammer as its velocity is upward and toward the target.

Throws are made from a throwing circle. The thrower is not allowed to step outside the throwing circle before the hammer has landed and may only enter and exit from the rear of the throwing circle. The hammer must land within a 34.92º throwing sector that is centered on the throwing circle. The sector angle was chosen because it provides a sector whose bounds are easy to measure and lay out on a field (10 metres out from the center of the ring, 6 metres across). A violation of the rules results in a foul and the throw not being counted.

 the men's hammer world record is held by Yuriy Sedykh, who threw  at the 1986 European Athletics Championships in Stuttgart, West Germany on 30 August.  The world record for the women's hammer is held by Anita Włodarczyk, who threw  during the Kamila Skolimowska Memorial on 28 August 2016.

All-time top 25

Men

Correct as of May 2022.

Annulled marks
Ivan Tsikhan of Belarus also threw 86.73 in Brest on 3 July 2005. This performance was annulled due to doping offences.

Women
Correct as of July 2022.

Annulled marks
The following athletes had their performances (over 77.00 m) annulled due to doping offences:
Tatyana Lysenko (Russia) 78.80 (2013) and 78.15 (2013).
Aksana Miankova (Belarus) 78.69 and 78.19 (both 2012).
Gulfiya Agafonova (Russia) 77.36 (2007).

Olympic medalists

Men

Women

World Championships medalists

Men

Women

Season's bests

Men

Women

See also

 List of hammer throwers

Notes and references

External links
IAAF list of hammer-throw records in XML
HammerThrow.eu (Results, Top-Lists, Records, Videos, ...)
HammerThrow.org (Information about the event, coaching tips and resources, ...)
Statistics
Hammer Throw Records
Hammer Throw History

 
Individual sports
Events in track and field
Sports originating in Scotland
Throwing sports
Summer Olympic disciplines in athletics
Articles containing video clips